Doctor Dream Records is an independent record label founded in 1982 by Dave Hayes that originated from Orange, California. During its time as an independent the company released over 100 records in punk rock, alternative rock, comedy, and heavy metal music. Their more well-known performers are Rich Little, Cadillac Tramps, and Swamp Zombies.  The company logo was designed by Josh Agle. Doctor Dream Records was sold to Mercury/PolyGram in 1997.

Roster
 The Cadillac Tramps
 Christy McCool
 The Grabbers
 D.I.
 Manic Hispanic
 Aversion
 Bitch Funky Sex Machine
 SPLNTR
 Fifty Lashes
 Cisco Poison
 Dash Rip Rock
 Drance
 Paul Kelly and the Messengers
 Joyride
 Shig & Buzz
 The Texas Instruments
 Tiny Lights
 The Black Watch
 Andy Prieboy
 Jerry Giddens
 Welt
 Screaming Bloody Mary's
Swamp Zombies
 Don't Mean Maybe
 Mosh On Fire Compilation
 Zebrahead
 The Joneses
 Knockout
 Human Therapy
 Eggplant
 Imagining Yellow Suns
 Ann Dejarnet
 El Grupo Sexo
 National People's Gang 
 Bob's Your Uncle
 Food For Feet
 The Cripples
 Trouble Dolls
 Standard Fruit
 Jonathan Thulin

See also 
 List of record labels

References  

American independent record labels
Record labels established in 1982
1982 establishments in California
Indie rock record labels
Punk record labels
Heavy metal record labels
Alternative rock record labels